City Homicide is an Australian television drama series that aired on the Seven Network between 27 August 2007 and 30 March 2011. The series was set on the Homicide floor of a metropolitan police headquarters in Melbourne. The main characters were six detectives, who solve the murder cases, and their three superior officers.

City Homicide did not return in its regular format in 2011. A six-episode mini-series titled No Greater Honour was shown instead which marked the closing storyline of the series. The mini-series guest-starred Claire van der Boom, Marcus Graham, John Howard and Graeme Blundell.

Production
The series' co-writers are John Hugginson who has previously worked on Water Rats, Murder Call and Blue Heelers, and John Banas who has written for All Saints and Stingers in addition to Water Rats and Blue Heelers. In an interview with the Herald Sun, Banas said the show had been in planning since "late last millennium".

The bulk of City Homicide is shot at Seven's South Melbourne studios and the show features Melbourne landmarks, such as Flinders Street station and the city's trams.

The series is distributed overseas by Southern Star Group.

The show originally starred Shane Bourne, Nadine Garner, Daniel MacPherson, Aaron Pedersen, Damien Richardson and Noni Hazlehurst. After the second season, the show's executive producers decided to vary the Homicide squad substantially—Nadia Townsend and John Adam were both added to the cast early in the third season, Bourne took a temporary hiatus that lasted most of the third season, guest star David Field made more frequent and substantive appearances, and main characters were written out of many episodes. This custom continued throughout the remainder of the show, with Field (still credited as a guest star) notably appearing more frequently than any other main cast member. Ryan O'Kane entered for seasons 4 and 5 (mini-series) as new member of the team Detective Rhys Levitt.

Cast

Main cast
None of the main characters appear in all episodes, as periods of leave and rostered days off are incorporated into each character's appearances.

Detective Senior Sergeant Stanley Wolfe (Shane Bourne, 70 episodes, seasons 1–5) is the operational leader of the Homicide squad. Wolfe is an authoritative yet compassionate boss with years of Homicide experience. He is highly religious, a recovering alcoholic and, as of the second season, going through a relatively civil divorce with his wife Linda. Stanley's reputation is threatened in season three by the resurfacing of an old case of his, which resulted in his alcoholism coming to light and his extended leave from Homicide, which ended in the season four premiere. He is seen to have a very proper nature (exemplified by his being called Stanley as opposed to Stan, although Jarvis does use the latter name), but can be extremely emotional in certain cases, usually ones concerning serial killers and children.

Detective Sergeant Matt Ryan (Damien Richardson, 82 episodes, seasons 1–5) is the sergeant of the team. In the first three seasons, Matt is a senior constable working alongside Duncan, Jen, Nick, Allie and Simon, but early in season four he sits the sergeant exam and passes with flying colours, and is permitted to return to Homicide and take up a sergeant position under Stanley. Although he is a competent detective, Matt struggles greatly with authority, and is often inadvertently undermined by the team. In season two, Matt began a relationship with Emma, which ended in season four when she moved to France. This breakup served as the catalyst for Matt getting his sergeant exam, as he was dissatisfied with his professional progress.

Detective Senior Constable Jennifer Mapplethorpe (Nadine Garner, 79 episodes, seasons 1–5) is one of the Homicide squad of detectives. In the pilot episode, she is introduced as a temporary replacement for Duncan, but later earns a permanent place on the team. She is a former member of the Fraud squad, and was also an undercover operative of the Secret Service with Nick. Jennifer considers herself married to the job, with Nick being her only genuine love interest over the course of the show. In spite of this, she demonstrates a compassionate and protective demeanour, particularly in relation to cases with children. Her name is purposely mispronounced by Jarvis, who calls her "Mayplethorpe".

Detective Senior Constable Duncan Freeman (Aaron Pedersen, 78 episodes, seasons 1–5) is a member of the squad. Duncan is the second-longest-serving detective in the team, but his position is constantly threatened by his hotheaded behaviour and his sustenance of injuries. Duncan was engaged to a recovering drug addict named Claire in the first season, but an alleged affair and her drug relapse ended the engagement. Claire is later arrested for drug possession and is placed in a sting operation in exchange for the charges being dropped, but is killed in the process, which deeply saddens Duncan. In later seasons, Duncan seems to get his temper under control, though his relationship with Terry Jarvis is fraught with tension.

Detective Senior Constable Simon Joyner (Daniel Macpherson, 54 episodes, seasons 1–4) is a former member of the Homicide team. Simon is an experienced detective, having joined the squad before the pilot episode. He possesses a slightly immature personality, and is occasionally reprimanded for not taking cases seriously. In season three, Simon's mental health is questioned after he witnessed Duncan being beaten, and his ongoing issues later result in assault, corruption and murder charges being levied against him. Although the charges are later dropped, Simon comes to realise his mental health is threatened by working in Homicide, and quits in the second episode of season four. He is never seen or mentioned again.

Detective Senior Constable Allie Kingston (Nadia Townsend, 47 episodes, seasons 3–5) is a member of Homicide. Added to the team in the season three premiere, Allie immediately steps on the toes of Simon, and the two share a tense relationship until his departure. Allie often acts first and thinks second, and her impulsive behaviour gets her in a lot of trouble with Stanley, Jarvis and Waverley, who readily admits that she does not like Allie and does not consider her a good detective. A champion runner, Allie joined the police force to escape the overbearing clutches of her mother, who has not spoken to her in years. Late in season four, Allie begins an illicit relationship with Rhys, which jeopardises their careers and earns Allie even more bad will with Waverley.

Detective Senior Constable Nick Buchanan (John Adam, 44 episodes, seasons 3–5) is a member of the Homicide squad. Nick is a later addition to the current team, first introduced in the season three episode "Thai Takeaway", but has worked in Homicide before, and was friends with Simon and Matt before joining the team. He also worked undercover with Jennifer before she joined Homicide, a fact which is unknown to the rest of the squad until late in season four. Nick is shown to be a highly competent detective, but his reputation is left in tatters after corruption allegations in season five.

Detective Senior Constable Rhys Levitt (Ryan O'Kane, 21 episodes, seasons 4–5) is the newest addition to the team. A direct replacement for both Simon and Matt (after he becomes a sergeant), Rhys is a well-educated but inexperienced officer. He holds a Master's in psychology from Oxford University, which brings about his nickname "Oxford", and his job in Homicide is his first-ever position in the police force. It is later revealed that Rhys is the nephew of Waverley, leading to many members of the team coming to the conclusion that Rhys exerted influence over his aunt to get him the prestigious position. Rhys does later prove himself a skilled detective and a very loyal member of the team, although is next to useless in any sort of physical situation. He has an affair with Allie in season four, but this quickly ends for the sake of their careers.

Commander Bernice Waverley (Noni Hazlehurst, 77 episodes, seasons 1–5) is the undisputed boss of Homicide. She began as the Superintendent of Homicide; however, in season two this position was jeopardised by corruption charges that were brought about by the brother of a former police officer who committed suicide after Waverley refused him a pension payout. Although the accusations were proven to be false, the brother's final revenge on Waverley involved killing her son, in the season two finale. After this debacle, Waverley returned to Homicide as the Senior Sergeant in season three after Stanley went on extended leave, with her Superintendent position being filled by Terry Jarvis. After Stanley returned to his old job, Bernice was later promoted above Jarvis to become the Commander of Crime, a position which necessitated her becoming less involved in day-to-day Homicide operations.

Semi-regular cast
Detective Superintendent Terry Jarvis (David Field, seasons 1–5) begins as the no-nonsense superintendent of the Drug Squad that botches the sting operation that killed Duncan's fiancée Claire, which creates a huge amount of tension and anger between the two. In the second season, Jarvis temporarily fills in for Waverley as Homicide Superintendent after her corruption charges and the death of her son, a position which he excels in, and enjoys. When Waverley returns and Stanley takes extended leave, Jarvis assigns her as the Senior Sergeant of Homicide, keeping her job himself. With Stanley's return, Waverley is promoted above Jarvis, thus restoring proper order in the squad's eyes. Jarvis remains highly involved in most Homicide investigations, often undermining Stanley and running the investigation himself. As a boss, Jarvis maintains frosty relationships with most of his team, particularly Duncan and Allie, and can be quite condescending, as exemplified by his use of the term "boys and girls" to refer to the Homicide squad.

Detective Senior Sergeant Claudia Leigh (Tasma Walton, seasons 2–4) is a psychological profiler brought in to some Homicide investigations to analyse the mentality of offenders. She often provides scintillating insights that assist greatly in investigations concerning particularly heinous crimes. In season three, Claudia also becomes a psychological sponsor for Simon through his downward spiral, trying to help him wherever she can. In season four, her psychological manipulation of offenders backfires when she is attacked by a serial killer who tries to rape and kill her; attempts thwarted by the quick-thinking actions of Jennifer and Claudia. She exhibits a very friendly demeanour, and maintains positive working relationships with everyone on the squad, even Jarvis, who refers to her as "Mrs. Freud".

Dr. Rhonda "Ronnie" Lafferty (Genevieve Morris, seasons 2–5) is a head pathologist with the city morgue whose specialisation is autopsies relating to suspicious deaths, therefore integrating her with the Homicide squad. Ronnie is a highly competent and upstanding medical examiner, and believes that all murder victims deserve a chance at being investigated. Ronnie has two teenage children that she cares deeply for, although she occasionally avoids them during particularly gruesome cases involving children to prevent frightening them. Ronnie is regarded by the entire team as an indispensable asset to their investigations, and develops friendships with everyone, especially Jennifer and Nick.

Josh Waverley (William Jarratt, seasons 1–2) is the teenage son of Bernice. He is first introduced in season one as being very polite and well mannered, although in later appearances he is seen to have substantial issues with bullying and violence. The Shannon Pierce case tests Josh's relationship with his mother, as he himself is demonised by his peers after she is accused of corruption. Josh's final appearance is in the season two finale, where his wrists are slashed by Pierce's brother to punish Bernice. His death has a debilitating effect on his mother, who struggles to cope, even after years.

Sergeant Karen Hatzic (Louise Crawford, seasons 1–3) is a uniform police officer often assigned to the day-to-day duties related to Homicide investigations, such as retrieving files, guarding suspects and witnesses and coordinating canvasses and doorknocks. In season two, Hatzic is taken hostage along with Jennifer and Wilton, but survives the ordeal and returns to work soon after.

Detective Senior Sergeant Wilton Sparkes (Marshall Napier, seasons 1–2, 4) is the leader of the additional Homicide squad. Sparkes' team is supplementary to Stanley's, and his squad is often assigned to paperwork and more mundane investigations, thus associating a stigma to being on this squad. Sparkes is married to an unfaithful wife, Lorraine, who carries on an affair with Simon throughout the first half of season one. In the pilot, Sparkes finds out about this indiscretion and threatens to tell Stanley, whose highly religious nature makes him unlikely to sympathise with Simon; however, he sustains a heart attack before he can tell Stanley. Sparkes later returns to Homicide in the primary squad, working underneath Stanley, and develops a working relationship with Simon. Early in season two, Sparkes is demoted to a uniform position after revealing secret Homicide information to a friend so he could collect the reward money offered in an investigation, and has his final appearance early in season four when a murder victim is discovered in Sparkes' division. Sparkes is perceived to be quite sexist and old-fashioned, and thus has tense relationships with Jennifer and Allie.

Recurring cast

Special guest cast
 Peter O'Brien as Warren Endicott (season 2, episode "Guilty As Charged")
 Blair McDonough as Cameron Gunning (season 2, episode "Golden")
 Craig McLachlan as Leon Grasby (season 2, episode "Golden")
 Rebel Wilson as Sarah Gilbert (season 3, episode "Dead Weight")
 Georgie Parker as Susan Blake (season 4, episodes "Aussie! Aussie! Aussie!" & "Good Cop/Bad Cop")
 Martin Sacks as Daniel Worthington (season 4, episode "Flight Risk")
 Derryn Hinch as Richard Hill (season 4, episode "Empowerment")

Episodes

Ratings

Weekly ratings
The following table shows the weekly ratings for the series. Season two has been split into two parts as season two aired in two television seasons.

The data is based on the five Metropolitan markets only.

 Episode six was broadcast on Monday 24 September in Sydney and Brisbane as per usual but was broadcast in Melbourne, Adelaide and Perth on Wednesday 26 September due to the broadcast of the 2007 Brownlow Medal count.

Home media
All series were made available on DVD. The season 3 DVD included the first eight episodes of Season 4, while the season 4 DVD included the remainder of season 4 episodes plus the six-part mini-series No Greater Honour.

DVD release
These DVD releases are now out of print. It was Announced In June 2022 that Via Vision Entertainment would be re-releasing the complete series of City Homicide on 7 September 2022.

Online streaming

Broadcast and distribution

References

External links
 City Homicide at The TV IV
 City Homicide at the Australian Television Information Archive
 

2000s Australian drama television series
Seven Network original programming
Television shows set in Melbourne
2007 Australian television series debuts
2011 Australian television series endings
2000s Australian crime television series
2010s Australian crime television series
Television series by Endemol Australia
Fitzroy, Victoria
2010s Australian drama television series